The 1992 U.S. Men's Clay Court Championships was an Association of Tennis Professionals men's tennis tournament held in Charlotte, North Carolina in the United States. It was the 24th edition of the tournament and was held from May 4 to May 11, 1992. Fourth-seeded MaliVai Washington won the singles title.

Finals

Singles

 MaliVai Washington defeated  Claudio Mezzadri 6–3, 6–3
 It was Washington's 2nd singles title of the year and of his career.

Doubles

 Steve DeVries /  David Macpherson defeated  Bret Garnett /  Jared Palmer 6–4, 7–6
 It was DeVries's 2nd title of the year and the 2nd of his career. It was Palmer's 4th title of the year and the 5th of his career.

References

External links 
 Association of Tennis Professionals (ATP) Tournament Profile

 
U.S. Men's Clay Court Championships
U.S. Men's Clay Court
U.S. Men's Clay Court Championships
U.S. Men's Clay Court Championships